Arthur Henry Cross  (13 December 1884 – 23 November 1965) was an English recipient of the Victoria Cross, the highest award for gallantry in the face of the enemy that can be awarded to British and Commonwealth forces.

Early life
He was born in Shipdham, Norfolk, one of five children. He moved to London when aged 15. He was married and became a father at the age of 18.

Military career
Cross enlisted in the 21st Battalion First Surrey Rifles, The London Regiment on 30 May 1916. In 1917, he transferred to the Machine Gun Corps. He was 33 years old, and a lance corporal in the 40th Battalion, Machine Gun Corps, British Army during the First World War when the following deed took place for which he was awarded the Victoria Cross.

On 25 March 1918 at Ervillers, France, Lance-Corporal Cross volunteered to make a reconnaissance of the position of two machine-guns which had been captured by the enemy. With the agreement of his sergeant he crept back alone with only a service revolver to what had been his section's trench and was now the enemy's. He surprised seven soldiers who responded by throwing down their rifles. He then marched them carrying the machine guns complete with the tripods and ammunition to the British lines. He then handed over the prisoners and collected teams for his guns which he brought into action immediately, annihilating a very heavy attack by the enemy.

The Victoria Cross was given for "extreme gallantry, initiative and dash". In June he was awarded the Military Medal for another act of bravery.

Legacy
Cross received an engraved gold watch upon visiting his old village, and later a road there was named after him. 

His medal was used as a prop in the film Carrington V.C. starring David Niven.

He was buried at Streatham Park Cemetery.

References

Monuments to Courage (David Harvey, 1999)
The Register of the Victoria Cross (This England, 1997)
VCs of the First World War - Spring Offensive 1918 (Gerald Gliddon, 1997)

1884 births
1965 deaths
London Regiment soldiers
Machine Gun Corps soldiers
British Army personnel of World War I
British World War I recipients of the Victoria Cross
Recipients of the Military Medal
People from Shipdham
British Army recipients of the Victoria Cross
Burials at Streatham Park Cemetery
Military personnel from Norfolk